First Methodist Episcopal Church (First United Methodist Church) is a historic church at 503 Walnut Street in Windsor, Colorado.  It was built in 1915 and was added to the National Register in 2004.

A Postmodern style addition,  in plan, was added in 1995, joined to the 1915 church by an enclosed  walkway.

References

Methodist churches in Colorado
Churches on the National Register of Historic Places in Colorado
Neoclassical architecture in Colorado
Churches completed in 1915
Churches in Weld County, Colorado
National Register of Historic Places in Weld County, Colorado
Neoclassical church buildings in the United States